Xavier Bourgault (born October 22, 2002) is a Canadian professional ice hockey forward currently playing for the Bakersfield Condors of the American Hockey League (AHL) as a prospect to the Edmonton Oilers of the National Hockey League (NHL). He was drafted 22nd overall by the Oilers in the 2021 NHL Entry Draft.

Playing career
Making his QMJHL debut with the Shawinigan Cataractes in 2018–19, Bourgault recorded 7 goals and 20 points in 62 games. In 2019–20, he increased his offensive output to 33 goals and 71 points in 63 games, for a 1.13 points per game rate. His points per game rate was raised yet again to 1.38 in 2020–21, as he recorded 20 goals and 40 points in a COVID-19 pandemic shortened 29 games. Recording only six penalty minutes that season, he was named a finalist for the Frank J. Selke Trophy, the QMJHL's award for sportsmanship.   
On July 23, 2021, Bourgault was drafted 22nd overall by the Edmonton Oilers in the 2021 NHL Entry Draft.

During the 2021–22 season, while pacing at a career best points-per-game with the Cataractes, Bourgault was signed to a three-year, entry-level contract on March 31, 2022.

Career statistics

Regular season and playoffs

International

References

External links
 

2002 births
Living people
Bakersfield Condors players
Canadian ice hockey forwards
Edmonton Oilers draft picks
Ice hockey people from Quebec
National Hockey League first-round draft picks
People from Chaudière-Appalaches
Shawinigan Cataractes players